In Commonwealth countries, poussin (pronounced  and less commonly called coquelet) is a butcher's term for a young chicken, less than 28 days old at slaughter and usually weighing  but not above . It is sometimes also called spring chicken, although the term spring chicken usually refers to chickens weighing .  The word is the French language term for the same thing.  Normally a portion is a whole poussin per person.

In the United States, poussin is an alternative name for a small-sized cross-breed chicken called Rock Cornish game hen, developed in the late 1950s, which is twice as old and twice as large as the typical British poussin.

External links
 The British Department for Environment, Food and Rural Affair' definition of poussin and coquelet
 The British Assured Food Standards organisation's definition of poussin.

Chicken as food